Sørumsand Idrettsforening is a Norwegian sports club from Sørumsand, founded on 21 November 1917. It has sections for association football, team handball and skiing.

The men's football team currently plays in the Third Division, the fourth tier of football in Norway.

External links
 Official site 

Football clubs in Norway
Sport in Akershus
Sørum
Sports clubs established in 1917
1917 establishments in Norway